Néstor Vicente Madali González (8 September 1915 – 28 November 1999) was a Filipino novelist, short story writer, essayist and, poet. Conferred as the National Artist of the Philippines for Literature in 1997.

Biography
He was born on 8 September 1915 in Romblon, Philippines. González, however, was raised in Mansalay, a southern town of the Philippine province of Oriental Mindoro. González was a son of a school supervisor and a teacher. As a teenager, he helped his father by delivering meat door-to-door across provincial villages and municipalities. González was also a musician. He played the violin and even made four guitars by hand. He earned his first peso by playing the violin during a Chinese funeral in Romblon. González attended Mindoro High School (now Jose J. Leido Jr. Memorial National High School) from 1927 to 1930. González attended college at National University (Manila) but he was unable to finish his undergraduate degree. While in Manila, González wrote for the Philippine Graphic and later edited for the Evening News Magazine and Manila Chronicle. His first published essay appeared in the Philippine Graphic and his first poem in Poetry in 1934.  González made his mark in the Philippine writing community as a member of the Board of Advisers of Likhaan: the University of the Philippines Creative Writing Center, founding editor of The Diliman Review and as the first president of the Philippine Writers' Association.
González attended creative writing classes under Wallace Stegner and Katherine Anne Porter at Stanford University. In 1950, González returned to the Philippines and taught at the University of Santo Tomas, the Philippine Women's University and the University of the Philippines (U.P.). At U.P., González was only one of two faculty members accepted to teach in the university without holding a degree. On the basis of his literary publications and distinctions, González later taught at the University of California, Santa Barbara, California State University, Hayward, the University of Washington, the University of California, Los Angeles, and the University of California, Berkeley.

On 14 April 1987, the University of the Philippines conferred on N.V.M. González the degree of Doctor of Humane Letters, honoris causa, "For his creative genius in shaping the Philippine short story and novel, and making a new clearing within the English idiom and tradition on which he established an authentic vocabulary, ...For his insightful criticism by which he advanced the literary tradition of the Filipino and enriched the vocation for all writers of the present generation...For his visions and auguries by which he gave the Filipino sense and sensibility a profound and unmistakable script read and reread throughout the international community of letters..."

N.V.M. González was proclaimed National Artist of the Philippines in 1997. He died on 28 November 1999 at the age of 84.  As a National Artist, Gonzalez was honored with a state funeral at the Libingan ng mga Bayani.

Works

The works of Gonzalez have been published in Filipino, English, Chinese, German, Russian and Indonesian.

Novels/poetry
The Winds of April (1941)
A Season of Grace (1956)
 The Bamboo Dancers (1988)
The Land and the Rain
The Happiest Boy in The World
Bread of Salt

Short fiction
"The Tomato Game".1992
A Grammar of Dreams and Other Stories. University of the Philippines Press, 1997
The Bread of Salt and Other Stories. Seattle: University of Washington Press, 1993; University of the Philippines Press, 1993
Mindoro and Beyond: Twenty-one Stories. Quezon City: University of the Philippines Press, 1981; New Day, 1989
Selected Stories. Denver, Colorado: Alan Swallow, 1964
Look, Stranger, on this Island Now. Manila: Benipayo, 1963
Children of the Ash-Covered Loam and Other Stories. Manila: Benipayo, 1954; Bookmark Filipino Literary Classic, 1992
Seven Hills Away. Denver, Colorado: Alan Swallow, 1947

Essays
A Novel of Justice: Selected Essays 1968–1994. Manila: National Commission for Culture and the Arts and Anvil (popular edition), 1996
Work on the Mountain (Includes The Father and the Maid, Essays on Filipino Life and Letters and Kalutang: A Filipino in the World), University of the Philippines Press, 1996

Awards and prizes
Given a Trophy from A Jokarts company (1997–1998)Regents Professor at the University of California at Los Angeles, 1998–1999Philippines Centennial Award for Literature, 1998National Artist Award for Literature, 1997Oriental Mindoro Sangguniang Panlalawigan Resolution "extending due recognition to Nestor V. M. González... the commendation he well deserves..." 1996City of Manila Diwa ng Lahi award "for his service and contribution to Philippine national Literature," 1996City of Los Angeles resolution declaring 11 October 1996 "N.V.M. González Day, 1996The Asian Catholic Publishers Award, 1993The Filipino Community of California Proclamation "honoring N.V.M. González for seventy-eight years of achievements," 1993Ninoy Aquino Movement for Social and Economic Reconstruction through Volunteer Service award, 1991
City and County of San Francisco proclamation of 7 March 1990 "Professor N.V.M. González Day in San Francisco," 1990
Cultural Center of the Philippines award, Gawad Para sa Sining, 1990Writers Union of the Philippines award, Gawad Pambansang Alagad ni Balagtás, 1989University of the Philippines International Writer-in-Residence, 1988Doctor of Humane Letters (Honoris Causa) from the University of the Philippines, 1987Djerassi Foundation Artist-in-Residence, 1986Philippine Foreign Service Certificate of Appreciation for Work in the International Academic and Literary Community, at San Francisco, 1983
Emeritus Professor of English, California State University, 1982
Carlos Palanca Memorial Award (Short Story), First Prize for 'The Tomato Game,' 1971
City of Manila Medal of Honor, 1971.
Awarded Leverhulme Fellowship, University of Hong Kong, 1969.Visiting Associate Professorship in English, University of California, Santa Barbara, 1968.
British Council award for Travel to England, 1965.
Intemaciones Award for Travel in the Federal German Republic, 1965.
Philippines Free Press First Prize Award winner for Serenade (short story), 1964.
Rockefeller Foundation Writing Grant and Travel in Europe, 1964Jose Rizal Pro-Patria Award for The Bamboo Dancers, 1961Republic Cultural Heritage Award for The Bamboo Dancers, 1960
Carlos Palanca Memorial Award (Short Story), Third Prize winner for On the Ferry, 1959
Philippine Free Press Third Prize winner for On the Ferry, 1959Republic Award of Merit for "the advancement of Filipino culture in the field of English Literature," 1954.
Carlos Palanca Memorial Award (Short Story), Second Prize winner for Lupo and the River, 1953
Rockefeller Foundation Study and Travel fellowship to India and the Far East, 1952
Carlos Palanca Memorial Award (Short Story), Second Prize winner for Children of the Ash-covered Loam, 1952
Rockefeller Foundation Writing Fellowship to Stanford University, Kenyon College School of English, and Columbia University, 1949–1950Liwayway Short Story Contest, Third Prize winner for Lunsod, Nayon at Dagat-dagatan, 1943First Commonwealth Literary Contest honorable mention for The Winds of April'', 1940

References

External links

On NVM, Peso Books, Publishing and Writing by Alberto Florentino
Books of N.V.M. González
N.V.M. Gonzalez: An Affair With Letters
N.V.M. Gonzalez: Filipino Writer by Isagani R. Cruz
Literary giant’s legacy survives fire by Lakambini A. Sitoy
N.V.M. Gonzalez, A Tribute by Allan G. Aquino
N.V.M. Gonzalez (1915–1999) A guide to literary criticism on the internet for N.V.M. Gonzalez

National Artists: N.V.M. Gonzalez
NVM Gonzalez A writer's inspiration: UP bestows 5th NVM Awards on Saturday
THE SYNTAX OF NIGHTMARES: A Review of N.V.M. Gonzalez's A Grammar of Dreams and Other Stories by Maureen Gaddi dela Cruz
BLOWIN' IN THE WIND: A review of The Winds of April by NVM Gonzalez by Nina Somea

 Analysis of Bread of Salt on Lit React

1915 births
1999 deaths
Filipino writers
People from Romblon
Filipino emigrants to the United States
Gonzalez, N.V.M.
California State University, East Bay faculty
American writers of Filipino descent
English-language writers from the Philippines
Burials at the Libingan ng mga Bayani
National University (Philippines) alumni
Writers from Romblon